Fiocchi Munizioni (Fiocchi Ammunition) is one of Italy's largest and oldest manufacturers of ammunition.
The company's headquarters and main production plant are in Via Santa Barbara in Lecco, Italy.

History

Fiocchi Munizioni was founded on 3 July 1876 in Lecco, Italy, by accountant Giulio Fiocchi.

In 1876, Giulio Fiocchi took over the ammunition production part of a weapon and ammunition company already based in Lecco, which produced small-caliber ammunition.

At that time a radical change was introduced in firearms: the newly developed breech-loader replaced the traditional muzzle loader.
Fiocchi started manufacturing cases with primers suitable for reloading; in the early 1890s production was extended to complete cartridges loaded with bullets or shot. At the same time, Fiocchi gave up the production of black powder, as it was no longer profitable.

At the beginning of the 20th century, Fiocchi diversified and began making snap fasteners  using scraps from cartridge production. Fiocchi Snaps was formed in 1903. It assumed an important role to counterbalance the trend of the ammunition market, but at the end of the 1980s Fiocchi made a decision to focus on ammunition as its core business, and the snaps factory was sold.

During its long life, Fiocchi has manufactured all kinds of ammunition from pinfire, shotshells, and cartridges to all kinds of cartridges and cases, both rimfire and centerfire. They are known for manufacturing rarer cartridges for collectors and enthusiasts, for example the .455 Webley.

Crucial dates in the history of the Fiocchi Group

1876 Year of foundation
1877 Start of ammunition production
1903 Product diversification: snaps
1930 Beginning of export
1940 Development of social policy in the territory of Lecco
1945 Bombing of the plant in Lecco
1946 Re-building of the plant
1970 Attack on the European markets
1980 Start of .22 Super Match production
1985 New quality inspection unit
1985 Start of "leadless" primers production
1989 NATO qualification of the cartridge 9 mm Parabellum
1990 Impulse to world-market expansion
1990 Quality System Certificate in accordance with the standards NATO AQAP-1
1991 Start of production of ammunition with frangible bullets
1993 New loading department for .22 cartridges
1994 New flexible manufacturing line for centerfire ammunition
1994 Automatization line for cases production
1995 New line of products: "Official" clay shooting cartridges
1996 New line of Spas Mil and Law Enforcement ammunition
1999 New line of hunting cartridges
1999 NATO qualification of the cartridges 5,56 mm Ball
2003 Environment Management System Certificate in accordance with the standards UNI EN ISO 14001: 1996
2003 Quality Management System Certificate in accordance with the standards UNI EN ISO 9001: 2000

Recent history

Fiocchi Munizioni makes small-bore ammunition and offers a wide range of products. Its presence and production sites are also in the United States and in Hungary. In 2008 Fiocchi UK was opened in Great Britain.

According to a recent interview with Carlo Fiocchi, the head of Fiocchi America, more than 75% of the ammunition sold by Fiocchi in the United States is also manufactured in the United States at Fiocchi America's production facility in Ozark, Missouri.  Specifically, Fiocchi America's composition of U.S. ammo manufacturing and sales according to the interview is as follows:

95% of the centre-fire rifle ammunition, which accounts for ~15% of Fiocchi’s U.S. sales
75% of centre-fire pistol ammunition, which accounts for ~35% of Fiocchi’s U.S. sales
100% of shotshells, which accounts for ~35% of Fiocchi’s U.S. sales
0% of rimfire ammunition, which account for ~15% of Fiocchi’s U.S. sales (along with components)

Qualifications and Certifications of prestige attest the level of quality achieved by the company:

NATO AQAP-110 Certification
ISO 14001: 1996 Certification of the Environment Management System
UNI EN ISO 9001: 2000 Certification of the Quality Management System.

Furthermore, Fiocchi shooting cartridges have contributed to several World Cups and Olympic triumphs, as the Games in Athens in 2004 as well as in those in Beijing in 2008.

In 2011 newly developed 12GA shotshells filled with chemical tracer Cyalume in which allows the shooter to see where the shots are going and will greatly help in the training of sporting clays.  The tracer shots are non-toxic and biodegradable and packaged in a sealed metal can in Fiocchi's line of Canned Heat ammunition.  The Canned Heat line of ammunition allows a greater shelf life and maintains the quality of the ammo throughout shipping, retail shelf, and consumer handling.

Fiocchi Munizioni was entirely owned by private capital heading to the Fiocchi Family, until Czechoslovak Group acquired 70% of the company.

Fiocchi of America 
In partnership with Smith & Wesson, the Fiocchi family had a factory in Alton, Illinois, in the 1950s. Diverging company interests caused Fiocchi to sell its share to Smith & Wesson and withdraw from the American market. Great-grandson Carlo Fiocchi joined the family business in 1980 at the age of 24 and worked as a product manager in charge of the English-speaking market, his assignment was no doubt influenced by the fact that his grandmother was British. His responsibilities included overseeing its meagre exports to the United States. Carlo travelled to the United States on his honeymoon, with instructions to bring back marketing research for a US facility.

Carlo concluded that opportunities could not be exploited unless Fiocchi had a physical presence. In 1983, an FOA facility was built in Springfield, Missouri, to import ammunition, the location selected because of his father’s existing contacts there and that it offered the most favourable rail and trucking costs. After a year and a half, they realized that importing loaded ammunition was not an effective business model. The company couldn’t react fast enough to the needs of the US shooters. Carlo returned to Italy and convinced the president, Paolo, to build a manufacturing plant on a farm he identified in the Ozarks near Springfield. Fiocchi negotiated a purchase with the farmer and loans with the bank. Providing a platform for quality manufacturing jobs, the Fiocchi enterprise was enthusiastically welcomed by the local government.

Nevertheless, in April 2005, Pietro, Carlo and Donna Swafford, chief operations manager, boldly attempted to revitalize the company. Due in large measure to their acumen, since then FOA sales have increased 500%. The US subsidiary imports empty primed hulls from Fiocchi Munizioni and wads from Italy, produced mainly by Baschieri & Pellagri and Gualandi in Bologna, world capital of machine shop engineering, home to Ferrari, Lamborghini and Ducati - and the ancestral home of the Fiocchi family.

Products
Fiocchi's product range includes:
Clay Target
Hunting
Centrefire
.22
Blank and Flobert
Special Law Enforcement
Ammunition for vintage or antique firearms
Canned Heat ammunition packaged in sealed metal cans.

See also

 List of Italian companies

References

 http://www.fiocchiusa.com/about-us-menu/fiocchi-history-menu

External links
Fiocchi Munizioni S.p.A. website
Fiocchi of America Inc. website
Nike-Fiocchi Sporting Ammunitions Ltd. website
A visit with Carlo Fiocchi of Fiocchi USA, interview

Ammunition manufacturers
Defence companies of Italy
Italian companies established in 1876
Italian brands
Firearm manufacturers of Italy